Elections for Oxford City Council were held on Thursday 3 May 2012. As Oxford City Council is elected by halves, one seat in each of the 24 wards is up for election.

Overall turnout was 29.4%, down from 61.7% in 2010. However, the 2010 election was held on the same day as the general election, accounting for the unusually high turnout in that year. The lowest turnout (17.5%) was in Northfield Brook ward and the highest (42.5%) in Iffley Fields.

Results 

Note: three UKIP candidates stood in this election, compared with one in 2010 and none in 2008. The last remaining councillor for the Independent Working Class Association, in Northfield Brook ward, stood down at this election; the seat was taken by the Labour Party.

This result has the following consequences for the total number of seats on the Council after the elections:

Results by ward

Barton and Sandhills

Blackbird Leys

Carfax

Churchill

Cowley

Cowley Marsh

Headington

Headington Hill and Northway

Hinksey Park

Holywell

Iffley Fields

Jericho and Osney

Littlemore

Lye Valley

Marston

North

Northfield Brook

Quarry and Risinghurst

Rose Hill and Iffley

St Clement's

St Margaret's

St Mary's

Summertown

Wolvercote

Party share of vote map

See also
Elections in the United Kingdom

References

 http://www.oxford.gov.uk/PageRender/decCD/Election_results_occw.htm

2012
2012 English local elections
2010s in Oxford